Cloak and Dagger is a studio album by Scratch The Upsetter, released in 1973.

Track listing

Jamaican version

Side one
"Cloak and Dagger" – Tommy McCook & The Upsetters
"Sharp Razor V/S" – The Upsetters
"Hail Stone" – Winston Wright & Upsetters
"Musical Transplant" – The Upsetters
"Liquid Serenade" – Winston Wright & Upsetters
"Side Gate" – The Upsetters

Side two
"Iron Claw" – Tommy McCook & Upsetters
"V/S Iron Side" – The Upsetters
"Rude Walking" – Tommy McCook & The Upsetters
"V/S Bad Walking" – The Upsetters
"Caveman Skank" – Lee Perry & The Upsetters
"Pe-We Special" – The Upsetters

UK version

Side one
"Cloak and Dagger"
"Hail Stone"
"Musical Transplant"
"Liquid Seranade"
"Retail Love"
"Creation"

Side two
"Iron Claw"
"Rude Walking"
"Cave Man Skank"
"Pe We Special"
"Sunshine Rock"
"Wakey Wakey"

References

The Upsetters albums
1973 albums
Albums produced by Lee "Scratch" Perry